The Cordillera de la Ramada (Spanish for "Range of the Shelter", also called Cordón de la Ramada, in which cordón means 'ribbon' or 'rope', is a mountain range in the San Juan province of Argentina, forming part of the Andes.

The first ascents of several peaks in the range were achieved by a Polish expedition of 1934 organized by the Tatra Society and led by Konstanty Jodko-Narkiewicz, whose party consisted of S. W. Daszynski, J. K. Dorawski, A. Karpinski, S. Osiecki, and W. Ostrowski. They climbed Mercedario, Alma Negra, Pico Polaco, La Mesa, and Cerro Ramada. 

Long ridge traverses are necessary to climb it.

Temperatures can be extreme in summer and winter, but the climate is stable in the autumn and the spring. The best time of year for climbing in the range is from mid-December to the end of February.

In the lower country beneath the range there are substantial mining industries, producing limestone, dolomite, bentonite, marble, aggregates, calcite and feldspar, as well as silver and gold. Paleontologists have found fossils here of some of the earliest dinosaurs, including the Herrerasaurus and Eoraptor lunensis. Local wildlife includes condors, rheas, guanacos and vicuña.

Mountains

Mercedario, the eighth highest mountain of the Andes, known in Chile as El Ligua.
Ramada Norte, 
Cerro del Nacimiento, 
Alma Negra, 
Cerro Ramada,  Argentina and Chile, 
La Mesa, 
Pico Polaco,

Notes

See also
List of mountains in the Andes

Mountain ranges of the Andes
Mountain ranges of Argentina